Abul Kalam Md. Ahasanul Hoque Chowdhury is a Bangladesh Awami League politician and the incumbent Member of Parliament from Rangpur-2.

Early life
Chowdhury was born on 6 October 1968. He has a B.A., M.A., and LLB.

Career
Chowdhury was elected to Parliament from Rangpur-2 on 5 January 2014 as a Bangladesh Awami League candidate. Local Awami League leaders in Rangpur District accused him of monopolizing power and controlling local politics in December 2017. In February 2017, he was warned by the speaker for using expletives in parliament against Muhammad Yunus, founder of Grameen Bank. He is a member of the Parliamentary Standing Committee on the Ministry of Industry.

References

Awami League politicians
Living people
1935 births
10th Jatiya Sangsad members
11th Jatiya Sangsad members